The Lüdao Lighthouse is a lighthouse in Cape Bitoujiao, Green Island, Taitung County, Taiwan.

History
The lighthouse was built and went into operation in 1939 after the SS President Hoover hit the island's reef on 11 December 1937 en route from Japan to the Philippines. The construction cost was funded by the American Red Cross as a thanksgiving to the local people who had rescued the passengers of the ship. The lighthouse was destroyed by an air strike during World War II but was rebuilt by the Republic of China government in 1948. Much later on, the lighthouse was opened to the public in September 2013. It has been designated as a historical building in Taitung County.

Architecture
The white lighthouse is 33 meters in height with 150 steps to the top of the tower. It was originally designed by a Japanese engineer.

See also

 List of lighthouses in Taiwan
 SS President Hoover
 List of tourist attractions in Taiwan

References

External links

 Taitung Travel - Taitung County Government

1939 establishments in Taiwan
Lighthouses completed in 1939
Lighthouses in Taitung County